Andrei Nikolayevich Dudnik (born 2 May 1981) is a former Russian football player.

References

1981 births
Living people
Russian footballers
FC Chernomorets Novorossiysk players
Russian Premier League players
FC KAMAZ Naberezhnye Chelny players
FC Lada-Tolyatti players
Place of birth missing (living people)

Association football midfielders